Pamela Jean Branch (née Byatt, 1920–1967) was a British author of four comic murder mystery novels.

She was born on her parents' tea plantation in Ceylon. She was educated in England, studied art in Paris, and attended the Royal Academy of Dramatic Art in London.

She married the solicitor Newton Branch, and they moved together to Cyprus. She divorced Branch in the late 1950s. In 1962, she married James Edward Stuart-Lyon. In 1967, she died from cancer, aged 47.

In 2009, The Wooden Overcoat was made into a one-hour BBC Radio 4 drama, adapted by Mark Gatiss, and starring David Tennant.

Bibliography

Novels
The Wooden Overcoat. Robert Hale: London, 1951
Lion in the Cellar. Robert Hale: London, 1951
Murder Every Monday. Robert Hale: London, 1954
Murder's Little Sister. Robert Hale: London, 1958

Stage Plays
Murder Every Monday (adapted from the novel) by Pamela Branch and Philip Dale. First performed in 1964

References

1920 births
1967 deaths
British women novelists
British crime writers
British expatriates in Sri Lanka
British expatriates in France